The Kintner House Hotel is a historic bed & breakfast, in the Corydon Historic District in Corydon, Indiana.  The present building was built in 1873, and is a -story, Italianate style brick building. The original Kintner House, two blocks away, was where John Hunt Morgan learned that Robert E. Lee lost at the Battle of Gettysburg. The Kintner House remained a hotel until 1920 and was used as offices until 1986. It was extensively restored and opened as a bed and breakfast in 1987.

It was added to the National Register of Historic Places in 1987.

See also

Kintner-McGrain House
Kintner-Withers House

References

External links
 

Corydon, Indiana
Hotel buildings on the National Register of Historic Places in Indiana
Italianate architecture in Indiana
Hotel buildings completed in 1873
National Register of Historic Places in Harrison County, Indiana
Buildings and structures in Harrison County, Indiana
Historic district contributing properties in Indiana